The 1927 World Fencing Championships were held in Vichy, France.

Medal summary

Men's events

References

World Fencing Championships
1927 in French sport
F